Dubai Eye is a Dubai-based talk radio station owned by Arabian Radio Network, which provides business, news, current affairs, sports, entertainment and special interest programming for a cross-cultural audience.

Presenters

Shows

Weekdays
6-10am The Business Breakfast with Brandy Scott, Richard Dean, & Tom Urquhart 
6-10am Dubai Eye on One (simulcast on Dubai One)
10-1pm The Agenda with Georgia Tolley
1-2pm Entertainment Extra
2-5pm Afternoons with Helen Farmer
5-8pm Off Script with Chris McHardy, Robbie Greenfield & Sonal Rupani
8-11pm Nightshift with Mark Lloyd
Saturdays 
4-7pm Extra Time at the Weekend

Presenters

Brandy Scott
Richard Dean
Tom Urquhart
Helen Farmer
Mark Lloyd
Chris McHardy
Robbie Greenfield
Sonal Rupani

Awards
 Business Breakfast, winner of the International Radio Conference Breakfast Show of the Year, 2006/2007.

See also
Radio and television channels of Dubai

References

External links
Dubai Eye 103.8 (official website)

Radio stations in the United Arab Emirates
Mass media in Dubai